Marga Anna Johanna Höffgen (26 April 1921 – 7 July 1995) was a German contralto, known for singing oratorios, especially the Passions by Johann Sebastian Bach, and operatic parts such as Erda in Wagner's Der Ring des Nibelungen, performed at the Bayreuth Festival and Covent Garden Opera in London between 1960 and 1975.

Career 
Born into a merchant family to parents Friedrich Höffgen (1899–1944) and her mother Maria, née von Eicken (1898–1944) in Mülheim an der Ruhr, Höffgen was 17 when she started studying at the Folkwangschule in Essen with Anna Erler-Schnaudt. Two years later, in 1939, she continued at the Musikhochschule Berlin with Hermann Weißenborn until 1942. In 1943, she was contracted by the Staatsoper Dresden, but did not start because she was pregnant with her second child.

She made her concert debut in Berlin in 1952. She was noticed internationally when she performed the alto part in Bach's St Matthew Passion in Vienna in 1955, conducted by Herbert von Karajan.

She was identified with the part of Erda in Wagner's Das Rheingold and Siegfried, sung first in 1959 at Covent Garden in London, and repeated at the Vienna State Opera and the Teatro Colón in Buenos Aires until 1975. She sang this role at the Bayreuth Festival from 1960 to 1964 and from 1967 to 1975, and from 1964 to 1975 she sang there the First Norn in Götterdämmerung. She died in Müllheim (Baden).

Recordings 
During the 1950s and 1960s, Höffgen was a soloist in recordings of Bach's major works with renowned conductors, soloists and ensembles. She recorded Bach's Mass in B minor with Karajan in 1953, with Elisabeth Schwarzkopf, Nicolai Gedda and Heinz Rehfuss. In 1954 she recorded the St Matthew Passion with conductor Wilhelm Furtwängler, Anton Dermota as the Evangelist, Dietrich Fischer-Dieskau as vox Christi, Elisabeth Grümmer and Otto Edelmann. In 1955 she appeared in the St John Passion, conducted by Fritz Lehmann, with Uta Graf, Julius Patzak, Gérard Souzay and Walter Berry. In 1965 she sang the contralto arias in the two famous Bach's Passions with Eugen Jochum and the Concertgebouw Orchestra. She appeared in Bach cantata recordings in the series of Kurt Thomas, Fritz Werner and Helmuth Rilling. In 1966, she took part in a distinguished Henry Wood Proms performance of Beethoven's Missa solemnis under Antal Doráti and the BBC Symphony Orchestra, which has been issued by the Doráti Society.

She recorded the role of Third Lady in Otto Klemperer's recording of The Magic Flute (starring Nicolai Gedda and Gundula Janowitz), which has been available since the vinyl days.

She sang the role of Erda in Wagner's Siegfried in the studio recording by Sir George Solti and the Vienna Philharmonic, with Birgit Nilsson as Brünnhilde and Wolfgang Windgassen in the title role.

In 1978, she recorded Requiem compositions by Max Reger, including his Hebbel-Requiem and the unfinished Dies Irae, with the NDR Chor and the North German Radio Symphony Orchestra, conducted by Roland Bader.

Personal life
In 1941, at 20 years of age she married conductor Theodor Egel (1915–1993) while still in Mülheim an der Ruhr. She had four children, Hans-Peter (1941), Martin (1944), Barbara and Thomas (1947). Martin Egel also became a singer.

Awards 
In 1976, Höffgen was named Kammersängerin by the state of Baden-Württemberg. She received the Order of Merit First Class in 1988.

References

Further reading 
 Ruhrpreis für Kunst und Wissenschaft 1962–1974, Stadt Mülheim an der Ruhr (ed.), pp. 47–50

External links 
 
 Marga HöffgenBBC 
 "Max Reger (1873–1916) – Requiem Op. 144b/Op. 145a/Dies Irae" (review), classics-glaucus.blogspot.de, 25 January 2008
 , from Wagner's Das Rheingold, Theo Adam as Wotan, Horst Stein conducting, 1973 Bayreuth Festival

German contraltos
1921 births
1995 deaths
Officers Crosses of the Order of Merit of the Federal Republic of Germany
20th-century German women singers